The National Curriculum of Northern Ireland identifies the minimum requirements of skills for each subject and the activities to   develop and applied the skills .

History
Before 1988 schools had total autonomy and teachers devised the curriculum for their pupils. Margaret Thatcher imposed the first 'common curriculum' for three of the four nations. Teachers opposed this prescriptive move. The first curriculum review took place in 1998–1999 in England and 2000–2004 in Northern Ireland, with a  further review in Northern Ireland in 2010.
The 1988  curriculum was rigidly  defined by subject., prescribing both  the content and the pedagogy, and had neither    teacher input nor testing. It proved over-ambitious and content-laden and was unmanageable. Cross-curriculum working and personal development was not covered. In England the Dearing Report trimmed the content, but did not change the structure;  the review in Northern Ireland was more thorough, and addressed the issue phase by phase.

Structure of the national curriculum

Foundation Stage
Language and Literacy
Talking and Listening
Reading
Writing
Mathematics and Numeracy
Number
Measures
Shape and Space
Sorting
Patterns and Relationships
The Arts
Art and design
Music
Drama
The World Around Us
The World Around Us
Personal Development and Mutual Understanding
Personal Understanding and Health
Mutual Understanding in the Local and Wider Community
Physical Development and Movement
Physical Development and Movement

Areas of learning and skills
Areas of learning 
Language and Literacy 
Mathematics and Numeracy 
Modern Languages 
The Arts 
Environment and Society 
Science and Technology 
Learning for Life and Work 
Physical Education 
Cross-Curricular Skills 
Communication 
Using ICT 
Using Mathematics
Other Skills 
Problem Solving 
Working with others 
Self-Management

Key stage 3
Key Stage 3 students are 11-14 year olds (Years 8, 9, and Year 10 in the Northern Ireland system). This is the first post-primary keystage.

Key stage 4 - Entitlement Framework
"Every school must  offer at least 24 courses at Key Stage 4, and 27 in the post-16 category. In addition, at least one third of the courses offered must be general and one third applied; that is the minimum figure", said Peter Wier.
 This was subsequently reduced to 21- of which one-third must be general courses, and one third applied courses. All secondary schools in Northern Ireland are in Area Learning Communities (ALC) where they are encouraged to co-operate, and deliver 'shared education'. To fulfill the required 21 courses a school is encouraged run a joint course with a neighbouring school and extra funding is available to help them do so.

Key Stage 4 students are 14 to 16 year olds (Year 11 and Year 12 in the Northern Ireland system). These students will study for GCSEs or an equivalent. Schools offer GCSE courses that map to the areas of learning- to provide a balanced offer.

References

External links
Statutory minimum content order 2007

Curricula
Education in Northern Ireland
Secondary education in Northern Ireland